Wormaldia is a genus of fingernet caddisflies in the family Philopotamidae. There are more than 140 described species in Wormaldia. Fossil species have been described from the Late Cretaceous Burmese amber of Myanmar.

See also
 List of Wormaldia species

References

Further reading

External links

 

Trichoptera genera
Articles created by Qbugbot